Straight from the Basement (also titled as Straight from the Northeast) is a studio album released in 1994 by the Washington, D.C.-based go-go band Northeast Groovers. The consist of thirteen tracks, including the singles "Booty Call", "The Twenty Minute Workout", "Van Damme", and "The Water" (which samples "Aqua Boogie" by Parliament).

Track listing

"Straight from the Basement" – 5:57
"Hey Ho (Live at Rick's)" – 10:38
"The Water" – 5:58
"Booty Call" – 7:66
"Come Here" – 4:42
"The Twenty Minute Workout" – 5:43
"Takin My Time" – 4:34
"24-7-365" – 4:07
"We Came to Party" – 7:09
"Ding A Ling Swing" – 5:03
"Mystery" – 5:35
"Van Damme" – 4:21
"Bounce to This" – 5:01

Personnel
Khari Pratt – bass guitar
Lamond "Maestro" Perkins – keyboards
David " 32" Ellis– vocals
Leonard "Daddy-O" Huggins – vocals
Ronald "Dig-Dug" Dixon –  percussions
Christia" Rapper" Black – vocals
Samuel "Smoke" Dews – congas, percussions
"Jammin" Jeff Warren – drums

References

External links
Straight from the Basement at Discogs

1994 debut albums
Northeast Groovers albums